Horațiu is a Romanian male given name that may refer to:

Horaţiu Badiţă (1976–2014), Romanian swimmer
Horațiu Cioloboc (born 1967), Romanian footballer
Horațiu Lasconi (born 1963), Romanian footballer
Horațiu Mălăele (born 1952), Romanian actor, cartoonist, writer, and theater and film director
Horațiu Năstase, Romanian physicist and professor
Horaţiu Nicolau (1933–2018), Romanian volleyball player
Horațiu Pașca (born 1981), Romanian handball player and coach
Horațiu Pungea (born 1986), Romanian rugby union footballer
Horațiu Rădulescu (1942–2008), composer

See also 
Horia (disambiguation)

Romanian masculine given names